Geevarghese Mar Coorilose is Metropolitan of Mumbai Diocese of Malankara Orthodox Syrian Church.

References

1949 births
Living people
Malankara Orthodox Syrian Church bishops
Christian clergy from Mumbai